Founded in 1966,  The San Francisco School is an independent, coeducational day school with a multicultural enrollment of 270 students, from preschool through middle school.  While the preschool program centers on the ideas of Maria Montessori, the elementary and middle school programs reflect the ideals of a progressive, child-centered approach.  The school also offers an extended care program, parent education opportunities, and summer recreational activities.

History
In 1966, a group of preschool teachers and preschool parents conceived of a new school.  They sought a community where parents and teachers could share in school governance, and where preschool children could thrive in a program guided by the principles of Maria Montessori, the Italian physician and educator who believed in every child's ability to learn.

Five parents and four teachers signed the original Articles of Incorporation in March 1966. The San Francisco Montessori School, one of the oldest independent coed day schools in San Francisco, opened the following September.

Tucked away in a church basement in the quiet Portola District, a working class San Francisco neighborhood, the school had just seven preschool students on opening day.  The financial capital to stock the school with equipment and supplies came from a $100 per student "enrollment fee."  The song, "'Tis a Gift to be Simple, 'Tis a Gift to be Free," that SFS students still sing today, certainly fit the school culture and finances of the time.

The successful new school grew quickly in popularity and population.  In 1969, the school purchased the present property at 300 Gaven Street.  Inspired by parent interest as much as preconceived design, the school added a first grade, and then grew organically in the 1970s up through the fifth grade, and to an enrollment of 145 students.  The elementary curriculum consciously developed away from the traditional Montessori method to a progressive approach, incorporating Montessori ideals of self-reliance, responsibility, and learning through experience, but also embracing the best of current teaching practices.

In the 1980s the school added an innovative Middle School Program.  The school changed its name to The San Francisco School, grew to an enrollment of 225, established an endowment, acquired additional land adjacent to the school, and constructed new classrooms.

The 1990s were years of consolidation, fund raising and more construction.  The school joined the California Association of Independent Schools, constructed a signature Middle School building on Gaven Street, launched an innovative professional development program, and became known for its enthusiastic and well-prepared graduates.

The first decade of the 21st century has already seen the Middle School expand to two classes per grade level, total enrollment grow to 275, the endowment surpass the two million dollar mark, and the school help launch a new teacher training program, the Bay Area Teacher Training Program.

Notable alumni
 Anna Lappe
 Erik Weiner

References

External links 
 The San Francisco School

Private middle schools in California
Private elementary schools in California
Montessori schools in the United States
Educational institutions established in 1966
1966 establishments in California